In algebraic geometry, a log structure provides an abstract context to study semistable schemes, and in particular the notion of logarithmic differential form and the related Hodge-theoretic concepts. This idea has applications in the theory of moduli spaces, in deformation theory and Fontaine's p-adic Hodge theory, among others.

Motivation 
Remembering this additional structure on X corresponds to remembering the inclusion , which likens X with this extra structure to a variety with boundary (corresponding to ).

Definition 
Let X be a scheme. A pre-log structure on X consists of a sheaf of (commutative) monoids  on X together with a homomorphism of monoids , where  is considered as a monoid under multiplication of functions.

A pre-log structure  is a log structure if in addition  induces an isomorphism .

A morphism of (pre-)log structures consists in a homomorphism of sheaves of monoids commuting with the associated homomorphisms into .

A log scheme is simply a scheme furnished with a log structure.

Examples 
The motivating example for the definition of log structure comes from semistable schemes. Let X be a scheme,  the inclusion of an open subscheme of X, with complement  a divisor with normal crossings. This is called the canonical (or standard) log structure on X associated to D.
This is in fact an instance of the previous construction, but taking .

Applications 
One application of log structures is the ability to define logarithmic forms (also called differential forms with log poles) on any log scheme. From this, one can for instance define log-smoothness and log-étaleness, generalizing the notions of smooth morphisms and étale morphisms. This then allows the study of deformation theory.

In addition, log structures serve to define the mixed Hodge structure on any smooth complex variety X, by taking a compactification with boundary a normal crossings divisor D, and writing down the corresponding logarithmic de Rham complex.

Log objects also naturally appear as the objects at the boundary of moduli spaces, i.e. from degenerations.

Log geometry also allows the definition of log-crystalline cohomology, an analogue of crystalline cohomology which has good behaviour for varieties that are not necessarily smooth, only log smooth. This then has application to the theory of Galois representations, and particularly semistable Galois representations.

See also 
Log geometry
Semistable scheme
Log-crystalline cohomology

References 

Algebraic geometry
Scheme theory